The invasion of Russia by Charles XII of Sweden was a campaign undertaken during the Great Northern War between Sweden and the allied states of Russia, Poland, and Denmark. The invasion began with Charles's crossing of the Vistula on 1 January 1708, and effectively ended with the Swedish defeat in the Battle of Poltava on 8 July 1709, though Charles continued to pose a military threat to Russia for several years while under the protection of the Ottoman Turks.

Historical context
In the years preceding the invasion of Russia, Charles had inflicted significant defeats on the Danish and Polish forces, and enthroned the king Stanisław Leszczyński in Poland. Having consolidated his victories there, he invaded Saxony, forcing it out of the war. Charles then turned his attentions to Russia. He entered Russia by crossing the frozen Vistula River at the head of 40,000 men, approximately half of them cavalry. This tactic was characteristic of his military style, which relied on moving armies with great speed over unexpected terrain. As a consequence of this rapid initiation of the campaign, Charles nearly gave battle with Peter the Great just one month into the campaign, reaching Hrodna, now in Belarus, a mere two hours after Russian forces had abandoned it.

Charles was a skilled military leader, and probably considered the invasion to be a risky enterprise; he had resisted the advice of his generals to invade during the Russian winter following the first Battle of Narva (1700). He chose to continue his invasion now because he expected Swedish reinforcements and the alliance of the Cossacks under Ivan Mazepa. The reinforcing Swedish army, however, was ambushed by Russians, and a Russian army under Aleksandr Danilovich Menshikov had destroyed Mazepa's capital and chased him to Charles with just thirteen hundred men.

Outcome
The invasion was further complicated by the scorched earth strategy formulated by Peter and his generals. The Russian armies retreated continuously, dispersing the cattle and hiding the grain in the peasant towns they passed, burning unharvested crops, and leaving no resources for the Swedish army to stave off the Russian winter. By the end of the winter of 1708–1709, the "Great Frost of 1709" had devastated the Swedish army and shrunk it to 24,000 men. In May 1709, the Swedish forces caught up to the Russians, and the two armies clashed in the Battle of Poltava. The Swedish were defeated, and the greater part of Charles's army, some 19,000 men, were forced to surrender.

Charles fled with his surviving 543 men to the protection of the Ottoman Turks to the south, who were traditionally hostile to Russia. Here, Charles was eventually able to persuade the Sultan Ahmed III to declare war on Russia. Backed by a Turkish army of 200,000 men, Charles led the Turks into the Russo-Turkish War (1710–1711). Before Charles could give battle, though, Peter was able to bribe the Turkish vizier to peace; with this, Charles's ambitions to invade Russia were ended.

Consequences
The consequences of the failed invasion were far-reaching. The Swedish Empire never added new territory after the Battle of Poltava, and shortly thereafter lost more possessions. George I of Great Britain led Great Britain and Prussia into war against Sweden, and Denmark reentered the war. Russia maintained its conquered possessions in Ingria and the Baltic, was able to consolidate its hold over Ukraine and Poland, develop the new city of Saint Petersburg, and gain vital trade links in the Baltic trade.

Nearly 100 years later, Napoleon invaded Russia and learned from the failed invasion committed by Sweden.

Battles

Notes

Great Northern War
Invasions of Russia
Russia
1708 in Russia
1709 in Russia
1708 in military history
1709 in military history
Charles XII of Sweden
Russia–Sweden military relations